The 2017 FIBA 3x3 World Tour Prague Masters was a 3x3 basketball tournament held in Prague, Czech Republic at a temporary venue constructed at the Wenceslas Square from August 5–6, 2017. This was the third stop on the 2017 FIBA 3x3 World Tour.

Participants
12 teams qualified to participate at the Prague Masters.

Preliminary round

Pool A

|}

Pool B

|}

Pool C

|}

Pool D

|}

Final Round

Final standings

References

External links
Prague Masters Official Website

2017 FIBA 3x3 World Tour
International basketball competitions hosted by the Czech Republic
2016–17 in Czech basketball
Sports competitions in Prague